Jamie Walker (born 25 June 1993) is a Scottish footballer who plays for Bradford City as an attacking midfielder or winger. He has previously played for Hearts, Raith Rovers and Wigan Athletic and represented Scotland at every youth international level.

Early life
Walker grew up in the Wester Hailes area of Edinburgh and attended Forrester High School. His great uncle was Tommy Walker, the former Hearts player and manager and Scottish international inside forward.

Club career

Heart of Midlothian
A member of Hearts under-19 squad, Walker's performances in the early part of the 2011–12 season earned him a new three-year contract extending his stay with the club until 2014.

With Hearts in financial difficulty and wanting to bring through members of their under-19 squad into the first team, Walker was sent on loan to Raith Rovers in November 2011 to gain first team experience. He made his debut for Raith on 26 November 2011, in their 3–2 win against Hamilton. Walker only trained one day a week with Raith, with the rest being spent with Hearts due to their use of astroturf causing greater risk of injury. On 4 January 2012  his loan deal was extended for another month. After a brief period back at Hearts, he returned to Raith on 31 January 2012 for the rest of the 2011/12 season. He scored his first goal for Raith on 11 February, in a 2–2 draw with Ross County.

Walker made his first team debut for Hearts on 18 August 2012, appearing as a substitute in the 2–2 draw with Inverness CT at Tynecastle. Walker capped off his debut season with an individual goal against St Mirren in May 2013. He was awarded Hearts' Overall "Young Player of the Year" for season 2012/13.

Season 2013–14 started well for Walker, helping his side to a 1–0 victory over city rivals Hibernian. The following week Walker scored an equaliser against Partick Thistle away from home. He scored again against Aberdeen which helped his team to a 2–1 win. This win took the club to −8pts after starting with −15pts due to the club entering administration. Hearts were eventually relegated, but Walker helped them regain top division status by winning the 2014–15 Scottish Championship.

Early in the 2016/17 season, Walker was given a two-match suspension after he was found guilty of diving to win a penalty kick against Celtic. The captain of Celtic, Scott Brown, called Walker a "cheat" after the match. Walker scored twice in a 4–1 win against Rangers on 1 February 2017.

Walker was subject to transfer speculation for most of 2017, with his contract due to expire at the end of the 2017/18.

Wigan Athletic
Walker moved to  Wigan Athletic for an undisclosed transfer fee in January 2018.

In August 2018 he joined Peterborough United on loan. He scored his first goal for Peterborough in an EFL Trophy tie against MK Dons on 4 September 2018. Walker was however recalled by Wigan on 2 January 2019 having made 18 appearances for Peterborough.

Heart of Midlothian

Walker rejoined Hearts on 28 June 2019 on a three-year deal. He broke his leg in August 2019. He returned to first team training on the 28th of October.

Bradford City
On 11 January 2022, Walker moved on loan to Bradford City, citing his wish for more playing time, after only making 7 appearances for Hearts in the 2021–22 season in all competitions.

On 8 May 2022, Walker agreed a two-year permanent deal with Bradford to begin upon the expiration of his Hearts contract on 30 June 2022.

International career
Walker has represented Scotland at U15, U16, U17, U19 and U21 level. Walker made his debut for the Scotland U21s against Luxembourg in a 3–0 win on 25 March 2013. In the game, he also scored his debut goal to make the score 1–0 with a volley from the edge of the box.

Career statistics

Honours
Heart of Midlothian
Scottish Championship: 2014–15, 2020–21

Scottish cup runner up 
Scottish League cup runner up

Wigan Athletic
EFL League One: 2017–18

Individual
Heart of Midlothian Supporters' Player of the Year: 2016–17

References

1993 births
Living people
Footballers from Edinburgh
Scottish footballers
Association football wingers
Scotland youth international footballers
Heart of Midlothian F.C. players
Raith Rovers F.C. players
Scottish Football League players
Scottish Premier League players
Scottish Professional Football League players
Scotland under-21 international footballers
People educated at Forrester High School
Wigan Athletic F.C. players
English Football League players
Peterborough United F.C. players
Bradford City A.F.C. players